The 2015–16 Lowland League was the third season of the Lowland Football League. The season began on 1 August 2015 and ended on 19 May 2016. Edinburgh City were the defending champions. Cumbernauld Colts were elected to the league as new members.

The league was won by Edinburgh City with two matches remaining on 9 April 2016, securing their second title after a 1–0 win over Stirling University. They played the champions of the 2015–16 Highland League (Cove Rangers) in the semi-finals of the League Two play-offs, winning 4-1 on aggregate. 

Edinburgh City then drew 1–1 at home in the first leg of the play-off final against East Stirlingshire, before scoring a late penalty to win 1–0 away from home in the second leg, winning 2–1 on aggregate to gain a place in Scottish League Two.

Teams

The following teams have changed division since the 2014–15 season.

To Lowland League
Transferred from Caledonian Amateur Football League
 Cumbernauld Colts

Stadia and Locations

League table
Threave Rovers were spared automatic relegation as neither champion of the two feeder leagues, Leith Athletic or St Cuthbert Wanderers, met licensing criteria. The club however, declined the opportunity to re-apply to the league and rejoined the South of Scotland Football League for the 2016–17 season.

Results

Lowland Football League play-off

It was proposed that the respective winners of the 2015–16 East of Scotland Football League (Leith Athletic) and 2015–16 South of Scotland Football League (St Cuthbert Wanderers) leagues would meet in a play-off, with the winner taking a place in next season's Lowland League.  However, neither met licensing criteria so the play-off did not take place.

References

Lowland Football League seasons
5
Scottish